Shengtailu station, is a station of Line 1 of the Nanjing Metro.

References

Railway stations in Jiangsu
Railway stations in China opened in 2010
Nanjing Metro stations